Stars On Earth (Japanese: スターズオンアース, foaled 27 February 2019) is a Japanese Thoroughbred racehorse.  She showed some promise as a juvenile in 2021, winning one minor race from three starts. She showed improved form in the following spring, running second in both the Fairy Stakes and the Daily Hai Queen Cup before taking the Grade 1 Oka Sho and Yushun Himba.

Background
Stars On Earth is a bay filly with a white star bred in Japan by Shadai Farm. During her racing career she was trained by Mizuki Takayanagi and raced in the yellow and black colours of Shadai Race Horse Co., Ltd.

She was from the second crop of foals sired by Duramente, who won the Satsuki Sho and the Tokyo Yushun and was named Best Three-Year-Old Colt in Japan for 2015. Stars On Earth's dam Southern Stars showed modest racing ability in her native Britain, winning one minor race from four attempts. She was the first foal of Stacelita, a multiple Group 1 winner in both Europe and the United States. As a descendant of the German mare Schonbrunn (foaled 1966) she was closely related to many other major winners including Sagace, Zagreb and Steinlen. Stacelita's second foal was Soul Stirring.

Racing career

2021: two-year-old season
Stars On Earth began her racing career in a contest for previously unraced juveniles over 1800 metres on firm ground at Niigata Racecourse on 1 August 2021. Ridden by Shu Ishibashi she started the 2.9/1 second choice in the betting and finished second to the favoured Rouge Stiria, beaten three quarters of a length by the winner. Ishibashi was again in the saddle when the filly started favourite for a maiden race for over the same distance at Tokyo Racecourse on 9 October and recorded her first success as she produced a strong late run down centre of the straight to take the lead inside the last 200 metres and win by two lengths from the colt Yuino Gotoku. Stars On Earth ended her first campaign in the Akamatsu Sho, a minor event over 1600 metres at Tokyo on 21 November when she started favourite but came home third of the nine runners behind Namur and Personal High.

2022: three-year-old season
On her first appearance as a three-year-old Stars On Earth started the 3.3/1 favourite when she was stepped up in class to contest the grade 3 Fairy Stakes over 1600 metres at Nakayama Racecourse on 10 January but despite producing a strong late run along the inside rail she was beaten a neck into second place by Lilac. In the Grade 3 Daily Hai Queen Cup at over the same distance Tokyo a month later she was again the beaten favourite, going down by a neck to Presage Lift after briefly taking the lead in the last 200 metres. Her trainer Mizuki Takayanagi felt that the filly's defeats were at least partly due to her tendency to hang to the right and attempted to remedy the problem by equipping her with a cheek-piece and a new type of bit.

On 10 April at Hanshin Stars On Earth was promoted to the highest level to contest the Oka Sho and started at odds of 13.5/1 in an eighteen-runner field. Namur (winner of the Tulip Sho on her last start) went off favourite, while the other contenders included Circle of Life, Presage Lift, Lilac, Personal High, Water Navillera (Fantasy Stakes) and Namura Clair (Kokura Nisai Stakes). Ridden for the first time by Yuga Kawada, Stars On Earth settled in mid-division and turned into the straight in ninth place. She looked unlikely to obtain a clear run but found a gap in the closing stages and produced an impressive burst of acceleration to catch Water Navillera on the line and win by a nose. After the race Kawada said."I’m just so glad that she actually snatched the win at the end—I knew we had caught up but couldn’t tell who’d won. I’d been aware during workouts that she was a bit difficult to control but besides keeping that in mind, the plan today was to stay in mid-pack and let her run in a comfortable rhythm. It was definitely her strength and determination that shone and gave us the win today. I’m looking forward to how she develops from here".

Pedigree

Stars On Earth was inbred 3 × 4 to Mr Prospector, meaning that this stallion appears in both the third and fourth generations of her pedigree.

References

2019 racehorse births
Racehorses bred in Japan
Racehorses trained in Japan
Thoroughbred family 16-c